Øystese Church is a parish church of the Church of Norway in Kvam Municipality in Vestland county, Norway. It is located in the village of Øystese. It is the church for the Øystese parish which is part of the Hardanger og Voss prosti (deanery) in the Diocese of Bjørgvin. The white, wooden church was built in a long church design in 1868 using plans drawn up by the architect C. Erichsen in consultation with Jacob Wilhelm Nordan. The church seats about 500 people.

History
The earliest existing historical records of the church date back to the year 1300, and it was relatively new at that time. The first church here was a wooden stave church with an open corridor encircling the building. This church was probably built in the late 13th century. There was also a  church porch with a bell tower above it. Over the years, the church had a number of renovations. Most of the corridors around the church had been removed by 1845. In 1845, the church underwent significant repairs, including removing the last portion of the remaining corridors that once encircled the church.

Even after the repairs of the church, the centuries-old building was still in poor condition. The parish received permission to build a new church. The architect C. Erichsen designed the church and the national church architect Jacob Wilhelm Nordan made some changes to the plan before construction. Askjel Aase was hired as the lead builder. In 1868, the new church was built on the new site. The new building was consecrated on 15 May 1868. After the new church was completed, the old church was torn down. During the demolition, the workers found a coin and other items dating to the early 1300s beneath the foundation, which help to date the construction of the church.

Media gallery

See also
List of churches in Bjørgvin

References

Kvam
Churches in Vestland
Long churches in Norway
Wooden churches in Norway
19th-century Church of Norway church buildings
Churches completed in 1868
Buildings and structures demolished in 1868
13th-century establishments in Norway